Events in the year 2014 in Kerala

Incumbents 
Governors of Kerala - Nikhil Kumar (till March), Sheila Dikshit (March - August), P. Sathasivam (from September)

Chief minister of Kerala - Oommen Chandy

Events 

 March 6 - Jose Chacko Periappuram at Lisie Hospital, Kochi became the first cardiac surgeon in India to conduct a successful heart re-transplant in the country. The replanting was done when a patient who had already received a transplant Heart transplantation developed a heart valve infection.
 April 21 - Sabarinath, the main accused in the multi-crore Total 4 U scam, who went absconding on bail surrendered before Judicial Magistrate Court, Thiruvananthapuram. 
 May 5 - APJ Abdul Kalam Technological University established through an ordinance.
 May 27 - Professional football club, Kerala Blasters FC established.
 May - Operation Kubera ￼launched by Kerala Police to contain illegal money lending business in Kerala.
 June 13 - Kerala Home and Education ministries jointly launched 'Clean Campus Safe Campus Project' to spread awareness to wean school students from usage of narcotics and drugs.
 August 22 - Government of Kerala imposes ban on Bars, restricts sale of liquor to Five-star hotels and Kerala State Beverages Corporation outlets and declares that state is planning to achieve Prohibition by 2024.
 November 2 - Kiss of Love protest at Marine Drive, Kochi.
 November - Communist Marxist Party (Aravindakshan) formed by a split in Communist Marxist Party.

Deaths 

 December 25 - N. L. Balakrishnan, 72, Actor

See also 

 History of Kerala
 2014 in India

References 

2010s in Kerala